Anatoly Anatoliyevich Shariy (born 20 August 1978) is a Ukrainian journalist, videoblogger and politician.

Following his investigative work, earlier in his career, Shariy received death threats. In 2012 he received asylum in the European Union, asserting prosecution by Ukrainian law enforcement bodies related to his journalism. Shariy currently lives in Spain.

In June 2019, he launched the right wing euroskeptic Party of Shariy, which took part in the 2019 Ukrainian parliamentary election, winning 2.23% of the vote. During the 2020 local elections, the party candidates entered several city and oblast councils. During the 2022 Russian invasion of Ukraine, the party was banned because of alleged ties with Russia.

Shariy was a strong critic of Euromaidan and the subsequent governments. He considered the Russo-Ukrainian War prior to 2022 to be an internal conflict and a civil war inside Ukraine, although he did not deny Russian involvement in the conflict. Following the 24 February 2022 Russian invasion of Ukraine Shariy has called this “This war is Russia's aggression and invasion against the Ukrainian people.”

In February 2021, Shariy was accused of treason and incitement to ethnic or racial hatred by the Security Service of Ukraine (SBU). On 4 May 2022 he was detained by Spanish authorities at the request of the SBU, accusing him of treason. On the same day, Shariy has been released with precautionary measures as reported by his lawyer, Gonzalo Boye. On 5 October 2022 Judge Santiago Pedraz agreed to close consideration of the extradition because Ukraine has not presented the demand for the reporter's surrender, nor the "relevant documentation".

Biography 
Anatoliy Shariy was born in Kyiv and lived there until 2012. Shariy began to engage in journalism in early 2005.

Shariy's first wife was Olga Rabulets, who, he says, saved him from compulsive gambling. In 2013 Shariy became engaged to journalist Olga Bondarenko (now , and they married in 2017. The couple now have a child.  Olga Shariy, together with Anatoly, co-manages the Sharij.net website.

Shariy began to engage in journalism in early 2005. In 2008, Shariy became a permanent author at the online editions of From-UA and Obozrevatel, From 2008 to early 2012 he was the head of the Investigation Department of the website Obozrevatel. In 2008–2011 Shariy authored a number of publications on organized crime in Ukraine.

In 2011 Shariy shot at a man with rubber bullets at a McDonald's restaurant after the man, according to Shariy, insulted his wife. Shariy reported the incident to police. Shariy later claimed that the case was later trumped-up due to his investigation of illegal drug trade, which he alleged was covered up by high rank members of Ukrainian law enforcement.

In 2011, journalists of the 1+1 TV channel and Shariy carried out a series of investigations of the alleged protection of the illegal controlled substance trade in Kyiv pharmacies by the Office for Combating Illegal Drug Trafficking (Ukrainian abbreviation: UBNON). On 7 June 2011 Shariy published the first part of the article "Does UBNON Spit in the Face of the Minister?". On 11 June Shariy was summoned for interrogation in the McDonald's shooting case, which had allegedly been closed already. On 20 June Shariy gave a press conference about the situation and claimed that the Ministry of Internal Affairs and UBNON ordered the pressure on him. The next day, 21 June, the criminal case for hooliganism was initiated against Shariy related to McDonald's shooting.

Next month Shariy and journalists of the "1+1" TV channel issued several publications alleging the involvement of the Ministry of Internal Affairs in covering up illegal casinos in Kyiv. On 12 July 2011 Shariy and the film crew of the "1+1" channel were locked on the casino premises. Shortly thereafter criminal investigators arrived and seized 34 slot machines and video recordings of the hall, resulting in a criminal case on gambling business. A few hours after the incident in the casino, a shot was fired at Shariy's car, but the journalist was not injured. In August 2011, a criminal case on an attempted assassination was opened. The car shooting incident was cited as an example of attacks on journalists in the Human Rights Watch report for year 2011.

After the attempted murder Shariy continued his journalistic activities. On 21 September 2011, after another publication exposing corruption in the Ministry of Internal Affairs, the case on the assassination attempt on Shariy was closed, and a criminal case was initiated against the journalist himself for "staging an assassination attempt".

After being placed on the all-Ukrainian wanted list, Shariy left the country and asked for political asylum in the European Union claiming persecution by the Ukrainian law enforcement for his journalist activities, basing on the 2011 incidents. In 2012 he was granted asylum in the European Union. He received a permanent residency permit in Lithuania for 5 years. After moving to Netherlands, Shariy currently lives in Spain.

From 2014 onwards, while living in European Union, Shariy focused on producing video blogs for his YouTube channel, which, among other things carried out debunking misinformation and propaganda in Ukrainian media. He frequently criticizes Ukrainian publications related to the events in Ukraine after Euromaidan, as well as the Ukrainian governments, usually in a derisive and insulting way.

In November 2015, Shariy filed a defamation lawsuit against his paternal sister Elena Manchenko demanding her to refute the online claim that he is a "pedophile and a thief." On 19 January 2016 the court dismissed the claim, stating that according to the Ukrainian legal practise, she is not responsible for public dissemination of her statements by third parties. On 20 March 2019 Anatoly Shariy won the case in the court of the Netherlands against Manchenko. The court found Manchenko guilty and demanded to pay Shariy 75,000 euros in compensation and to publicly refute her accusations against the journalist.

In 2017 Russian lawyer Mark Feygin said that Anatoly Shariy was under investigation in a pedophilia case. Shariy sued him for defamation and won the lawsuit in Russian courts.

Shariy is among the 48 authors of the 2018 book of memoirs Oles Buzina. Prophet and Martyr ("Олесь Бузина. Пророк и мученик"), banned in Ukraine.

In February 2021 the Security Service of Ukraine (SBU) accused Shariy of committing crimes under Part 1. Article 111 "High treason" and Part 1. Art. 161 "Violation of the equality of citizens depending on their race, nationality, religious beliefs, disability and other grounds" and published a video with alleged evidence against Shariy, including his statement about the inhabitants of Western Ukraine. In 2014 Shariy had posted a private video with insulting statements about Western Ukrainians: Shariy later apologized for the video and said that he was talking only about certain individuals.

In May 2021, it was reported that Lithuania revoked its political asylum for Shariy, and some media published reports that Shariy was a persona non grata. Shariy himself refuted this and claimed this was false information based on the words of Mark Feygin.

On 22 March 2022, during the 2022 Russian invasion of Ukraine, the National Security and Defense Council of Ukraine suspended the Party of Shariy because of its alleged ties with Russia. On 16 June 2022 the Eighth Administrative Court of Appeal banned the party. The decision was open to appeal at the Supreme Court of Ukraine. On 6 September 2022 the Supreme Court rejected this appeal and thus finally banned Party of Shariy.

On 4 May 2022 Spanish authorities detained Shariy at the request of the SBU, accusing him of treason. On the same day Shariy was released with precautionary measures according to his lawyer, Gonzalo Boye.

On 4 October 2022 judge of the National High Court Santiago Pedraz concluded that Shariy was no longer living in Spain. Pedraz details this in a ruling where of an appeal filed by the defense against consideration of the reporter's extradition to Ukraine because he allegedly left Catalonia for Italy. That was the version of the escape, which the Ukrainian special services sent to the investigator, but which was always refuted by his lawyer Gonzalo Boye. According to the ruling by Pedraz, the documentation provided by the defense shows that Shariy is “in Spain”. But, in addition to accepting these defense arguments, Pedraz made another decision in favor of Shariy. On 5 October 2022 Judge Santiago Pedraz agreed to close consideration of the extradition because Ukraine had not presented the demand for Shariy's surrender, nor the "relevant documentation."

Political views and activism

Shariy's position on Russia-Ukraine war 
Shariy referred to the War in Donbass up until 2022, as an "internal conflict" and "civil war", while not denying the presence of Russian military in the area. He considers the separatist Donetsk and Luhansk areas to be the territories of Ukraine and the Russian annexation of Crimea to be inadmissible. “As a Ukrainian citizen my position is that Crimea is part of Ukraine,” Shariy said at a press conference on 20 October 2021, at the Press Club in Brussels, adding that he had the same opinion concerning the whole of Donbas.

Following the 2022 Russian invasion of Ukraine Shariy stated: “This war is Russia's aggression and invasion against the Ukrainian people.”

Belen Carreno and Andrei Khalip claim that Shariy supported a Kremlin assertion that Ukraine is a "western colony" dominated with anti-Russian "neo-Nazis", which has been used by Russia to justify its 2022 invasion of Ukraine. But on 5 October 2022 the judge of the National High Court Santiago Pedraz closed the consideration of the extradition, since Ukraine did not provide proper evidence and arguments for anti-Ukrainian activities.

Criticism of Poroshenko and his presidency

In December 2018, Anatoly Shariy offered UAH 15,000 to anyone who asks Poroshenko about the reasons for the persecution of blogger Shariy. In early 2019 in many cities of Ukraine this question was asked during meetings with the president. In a number of cases, there was an inadequate reaction of the president and his guards to this: the president's bodyguards knocked the phones out of the hands of the questioners, "the SBU officers beat the brave ones, and the president himself tore off their caps", slapped in the face and pinched those who voiced question.

When in late February – early March 2019, journalists from website bihus.info published the correspondence of Ukroboronprom leaders who were engaged in money laundering on parts for military equipment purchased in Russia, Anatoly Shariy presented evidence that President Petro Poroshenko's company "Leninskaya Kuznya" misappropriated the state budget by selling unusable spare parts at an overpriced (3-6 times) price to the military.

Criticism of Zelensky's presidency 

Shariy opposed the land privatization program, which was implemented at the request of the IMF, as well as against the issuance of the next tranche of the IMF, which was signed on conditions unfavorable for Ukraine.

After in 2020 the Ukrainian nationalists attacked journalists of “Shariy.net“ on 11—12 June, Shariy called his supporters to rally near the President's office. On 15 June 2020, during the peaceful rally, the demonstrators demanded Zelensky's reaction to the current situation.

After the 2022 Russian invasion of Ukraine, Shariy accused Zelensky, along with Ukrainian media, of manipulating public opinion in the west.

Shariy's attitude towards homosexuality 
In early 2000s Anatoly Shariy belonged to the Organizing Committee of the movement "Love Against Homosexuality". In that position Shariy described homosexuals as sick people and advocated criminal liability for propaganda of homosexualism.

In a 2010 article "Blue Rust. Dictatorship of Sodomites" Shariy expressed an opinion that due to death sentences for same-sex and adultery relationships in Iran after the Islamic revolution the situation with prostitution, pedophilia, and rape in Iran was much better than in Ukraine.” In the summer of 2020, journalist Sergei Ivanov posted screenshots of Anatoly Shariy's publications from 2010 in which he showed understanding for the extermination of homosexuals and Roma in gas chambers during the Third Reich.

In 2021 Shariy apologized "for his past from 11 years ago" and claimed his views had been changed since then.

Remarks about Western Ukrainians
In 2014 Shariy posted a private video with insulting statements about Western Ukrainians:

Shariy later apologized for the video and said that he was talking only about certain individuals.

In February 2021 the Security Service of Ukraine (SBU) accused Shariy of committing crimes under Part 1. Article 111 "High treason" and Part 1. Art. 161 "Violation of the equality of citizens depending on their race, nationality, religious beliefs, disability and other grounds" and published a video with alleged evidence against Shariy, including his statement about the inhabitants of Western Ukraine.

Cultural and political image

Accusations of Shariy in "anti-Ukrainism" and "pro-Russian" position
Ukrainian media and politicians routinely describe Shariy as a pro-Kremlin or anti-Ukrainian propagandist; see e.g., the Ukrainian News Agency, Alexei Navalny and others.

Shariy responded to these accusations by declaring that last years he did not like Vladimir Putin anymore and that he would not call to vote for him. On the other hand, Deutsche Welle states that Shariy justified the arrests of participants of the 2017–2018 Russian protests by saying that Russian authorities should not wait until the first molotov cocktails appear. In 2015 Shariy announced a reward of 1,000 Euro to anybody who demonstrates a piece of pro-Russian or anti-Ukrainian propaganda in his posts. During the 2019 Parliamentary Elections he increased the bounty to 5,000 Euro. In 2017, Shariy in his video blog criticized the Russian authorities for the criminal prosecution of opposition blogger Rustem Adagamov.

In February 2017 Shariy demanded through the court to refute the information published by the Internet publication ", which, defames his honor, dignity and business reputation because of the article of journalist Bohdan Lohvynenko, in which Shariy was called "the bullhorn of the Russian world" and "a scandalous Ukrainian pseudo refugee". In court, representatives of the defendants said that the definition of "Russian world" in itself does not carry a negative connotation, and therefore Shariy should not resent the expression "bullhorn of the Russian world".

Journalist Vitaliy Portnikov characterized Shariy as a "Kremlin project" and "one used by its Russian owners" and Anatoli Shariy filed a lawsuit to refute these words. During the trial, Portnikov referred to the definitions of the Big Explanatory Dictionary, according to which the Kremlin is an internal fortress in the cities of ancient Rus', and the project is a set of documents. Therefore, Portnikov insisted that there was nothing negative in the phrase “Kremlin project”, and the phrase “Russian owners” was a conditional assessment, not an objective fact.

The New Voice of Ukraine described Shariy as "a blogger-turned-propagandist", whose main activities are "discrediting Ukrainian state policy, deliberately spreading misinformation about Russia’s eight-year-long war against Ukraine in the Donbas, attempting to disrupt political and social stability in Ukraine, inciting internal conflicts on ethnic and religious grounds", noting how Shariy often features on TV stations owned by pro-Russian oligarch Viktor Medvedchuk, such as NewsOne, 112 Ukraine and ZIK TV. The outlet also underlined how Shariy often propagated pro-Russian fake news and extremely hateful rhetoric against people living in Western Ukraine. However, Shariy publicly always recognized the territorial sovereignty of Ukraine and called the Donbass and Crimea Ukrainian.

Petro Poroshenko, at a meeting with voters, called the blogger a "Kremlin bastard". On 10 January 2019 Poroshenko said that Shariy was not a Ukrainian journalist and worked for Russia. In the same month Shariy a filed a defamation lawsuit. In May 2020 Pechersky District Court of Kyiv declared that it had not seen evidence that Shariy works for Russia, is a Russian journalist or works for any person who is a resident of the Russian Federation and has found such information unreliable. The Court ordered Poroshenko to refute his false statements in the nearest issue of the Uryadovy Kuryer newspaper. This judgement was later reverted by a court of appeals, dismissing Shariy's lawsuit.

Awards and recognition
In 2009, Shariy won the Yousmi Web-Journalism Award for "Best Story (Non-Professional)". In April 2016 Shariy was named laureate of the Russia-based International Literary-Media Oles Buzina Contest (Международный литературно-медийный конкурс имени Олеся Бузины).

In November 2017, in a Novoye Vremya magazine rating of the personalities by number of readers in the Ukrainian segments of Facebook and Twitter, Shariy got the 12th place with the aggregate audience of 511,000 people.  In the same month he was number 3 of the top most popular Ukrainian political bloggers on Facebook according to the rating of Espreso TV.

In 2019 Shariy was 34th in the list of Top-100 most influential people and phenomena in Ukraine compiled by media holding .

The company Brand Analytics regularly publishes its ratings of Russophone YouTube-bloggers. In its ratings February 2019, in terms of viewer engagement rate (defined by the company as the sum of likes and comments), Shariy's vlog held the 1st place, collecting about 3 million likes and 430,000 comments. In terms of audience, with 1.8 million subscribers he was on the 38th place. The company noticed that political topics usually attracts a small fraction of YouTube viewers. In its June 2020 ranking - Top 20 Russian-speaking YouTube bloggers in terms of involvement, Anatoly Shariy was the 3rd with 4.4 million people involved.

Notes

References

External links 
 
 

Video bloggers
Ukrainian YouTubers
Investigative journalists
21st-century journalists
Journalists from Kyiv
21st-century Ukrainian politicians
Politicians from Kyiv
Ukrainian refugees
Refugees in Europe
1978 births
Living people
Russian propagandists